The Oman national handball team is the national handball team of Oman.

Asian Championship record
2004 – 9th place
2014 – 8th place
2016 – 8th place
2018 – 8th place
2022 – 10th place

References

External links
IHF profile

Men's national handball teams
handball